The FIM Women's Motocross World Championship is a women-only motorcross championship, inaugurated in 2005, and is a feeder series to the FIM Motocross World Championship.

Champions

External links
MXGP Official website

Motocross World Championship